The 1969 Miami Hurricanes football team represented the University of Miami as an independent during the 1969 NCAA University Division football season. Led by sixth-year head coach Charlie Tate, the Hurricanes played their home games at the Miami Orange Bowl in Miami, Florida. Miami finished the season with a record of 4–6.

Schedule

Roster
 Vince Opalsky, Sr.

References

Miami
Miami Hurricanes football seasons
Miami Hurricanes football